Palestinian political violence refers to acts of violence perpetrated for political ends in relation to the State of Palestine or in connection with Palestinian nationalism. Common political objectives include self-determination in and sovereignty over Palestine, or the "liberation of Palestine" and recognition of a Palestinian state, either in place of both Israel and the Palestinian territories, or solely in the Palestinian territories. More limited goals include the release of Palestinian prisoners or the Palestinian right of return. Other motivations include personal grievances, trauma or revenge.

Palestinian groups that have been involved in politically motivated violence include the Palestinian Liberation Organization (PLO), Fatah, the Popular Front for the Liberation of Palestine (PFLP), the Popular Front for the Liberation of Palestine – General Command (PFLP-GC), the Democratic Front for the Liberation of Palestine, the Abu Nidal Organization, the Palestinian Islamic Jihad, and Hamas. The PLO officially renounced terrorism in 1988, and Fatah says it no longer engages in terrorism, although the Authority continues to provide stipends to the families of Palestinians killed or arrested by Israel through the Palestinian Authority Martyr's Fund, payouts that according to the Jerusalem Center for Public Affairs take up 7% of the Authority's national budget. Several of these groups are considered terrorist organizations by the United States government, Canada, the United Kingdom, Japan, New Zealand and the European Union.

Palestinian political violence has targeted Israelis, Palestinians, Lebanese, Jordanians, Egyptians, Americans and citizens of other countries. Attacks have taken place both within Israel and the Palestinian territories as well as internationally and have been directed at both military and civilian targets. Tactics have included hostage taking, plane hijacking, boat hijacking, stone and improvised weapon throwing, Improvised explosive device (IED), knife attack, shooting spree, vehicle-ramming attack, car bomb, suicide attack, assassination and various bombings.

Israeli statistics state that 3,500 Israelis have been killed and 25,000 have been wounded as a result of terrorism since the establishment of the state of Israel in 1948.
 Israeli statistics listing 'hostile terrorist attacks' also include incidents in which stones are used as weapons and include those killed in exchanges of gunfire. Suicide bombings constituted 0.5% of Palestinian attacks against Israelis in the first two years of the Al Aqsa Intifada, though this percentage accounted for half of the Israelis killed in that period. As of 2022, a majority of Palestinians, 59%, believe armed attacks against Israelis inside Israel are an effective measure to end the occupation, with 56% supporting them.

History

Overview and context

In protest against the Balfour Declaration, which proposed Palestine as a homeland for the Jewish people, and its implementation under a League of Nations Mandate for Great Britain, Palestinians, both Muslim and Christian, from November 1918 onwards, began to organize in opposition to Zionism. By the end of Ottoman rule, the Jewish population of Palestine was 56,000 or one-sixth of the population. Hostility to Jewish immigration led to incidents, such as the riots of April 1920, the Jaffa riots of 1921, the 1929 Palestine riots, until a general Arab revolt broke out for three years, in 1936–1939, which was crushed, with the loss of 5,000 lives, by the British army. After the passing of the United Nations Partition Plan for Palestine in 1947 which called for the establishment of independent Arab and Jewish States, a Palestinian Civil War broke out. On the declaration of the state of Israel, May 15, 1948, a full-scale war, involving also the intervention of neighbouring Arab states, took place, with casualties of 6,000 Israelis and, according to the 1958 survey by Arif al-Arif, 13,000 Palestinians and the exodus, through expulsion, or panicked flight, of approximately 700,000 Arab Palestinians who subsequently became refugees. In the Six-Day War, a further 280,000–360,000 Palestinians became refugees, and the remaining Palestinian territories were also occupied from Jordan and from Egypt, and later began to be settled by Jewish and Israeli settlers, while the Palestinians were placed under military administration. While historically, Palestinian militancy was fragmented into several groups, the PLO led, and eventually united, most factions, while conducting military campaigns that varied from airplane hijackings, militant operations and civil protest. In 1987, a mass revolt, of predominantly civil resistance, called the First Intifada, exploded, leading to the Madrid Conference of 1991, and subsequently to the Oslo I Accord, which produced an interim understanding allowing a new Palestinian authority, the Palestinian National Authority (PNA) to exercise limited autonomy in 3% (later 17%) of the West Bank, and parts of the Gaza Strip not used or earmarked for Israeli settlement. Frustration over the perceived failure of the peace talks to yield a Palestinian state led to the outbreak of the Al Aqsa Intifada in September 2000, which ended in 2005, coincident with the Israeli withdrawal from Gaza. The rise of Hamas, the use of Palestinian rocketry and Israel's control of Gaza's borders, has led to further chronic violence, culminating in a further two conflicts, the Gaza War of 2008–09 and Operation Pillar of Defense in 2012. It is estimated that since 1920, when the first riots against Jews broke out, 90,785 Arabs including Palestinians have died, and some 67,602 been wounded in all wars and conflicts between Israel and its neighbors. On the other hand, 24,841 Jews and Israelis have died and 35,356 have been wounded during the same period. Since 1967, some reports estimate that some 40% of the male population of the West Bank and Gaza have been arrested or detained in Israeli prisons for political or military reasons.

British-mandated Palestine (1917–1947) 
Violence against the Jews in Palestine followed the Balfour Declaration in November 1917 which stimulated Jewish migrants to settle in Palestine. At this time the Arabs were both geographically and demographically dominant compared to the Jewish population, where the majority of Arabs were distributed throughout the highlands of Judea, Samaria and Galilee and the Jewish population was scattered in small towns and rural communities. The Arabs realized that the Jewish community, due to their lower numbers, was vulnerable to attrition and less able to take casualties. Therefore, they adopted a "war of attrition" tactic which was advantageous to the more numerous Arab community.

Many the deaths were inflicted during short time spans and in a few locations. For instance, in April 1920 about 216 Jews became casualties (killed or wounded) during a single day in Jerusalem. By May 1921, the casualty rate for Jews was approaching 40 per day and in August 1929 it had risen to 80 per day. During the 1929 riots, one percent of the Jewish population of Jerusalem became casualties, in Safed 2 per cent and in Hebron 12 per cent.

During the 1920–1929 attacks on Jews were organized by local groups and encouraged by local religious leaders. As the Jewish community did not count on the British rulers to protect them, they formed the Haganah which were predominantly defensive in the 1920s.

During the Arab Revolt in the 1936–1939 period, violence was coordinated and organized by the Grand Mufti of Jerusalem and was directed against both Jews and the British rule. Due to the rising level of Arab violence, the Haganah started to pursue an offensive strategy.

UN Partition Plan to establishment of PLO (1947–1964)

Around 400 Palestinian 'infiltrators' were killed by Israeli Security Forces each year in 1951, 1952 and 1953; a similar number and probably far more were killed in 1950. 1,000 or more were killed in 1949. At least 100 were killed during 1954–1956. In total upward of 2,700 and possibly as many as 5,000 'infiltrators' were killed by the IDF, police, and civilians along Israel's borders between 1949 and 1956. Most of the people in question were refugees attempting to return to their homes, take back possessions that had been left behind during the war and to gather crops from their former fields and orchards inside the new Israeli state. Meron Benivasti states that the fact that the "infiltrators" were for the most part former inhabitants of the land returning for personal, economic and sentimental reasons was suppressed in Israel as it was feared that this may lead to an understanding of their motives and to the justification of their actions.

Throughout the period 1949–56 the Egyptian government opposed the movement of refugees from the Gaza strip into Israel, but following the IDF's Gaza Raid on February 28, 1955, the Egyptian authorities facilitated militant infiltration but still continued to oppose civilian infiltration. At first, Palestinians were trying to go back to their houses or to retrieve property   but after 1950 these acts became much more violent and included killings of civilians in nearby cities.

After Israel's Operation Black Arrow in 1955 which came as a result of a series of massacres in the city of Rehovot, the Palestinian fedayeen were incorporated into an Egyptian unit. John Bagot Glubb, a high-ranking British army general who worked with the Arab Legion, explained in his autobiographical history of the period how he convinced the Legion to arm and train the fedayeen for free. Between 1951 and 1956, 400 Israelis were killed and 900 wounded by fedayeen attacks.; according to the Anti-Defamation League "[i]n 1955 alone, 260 Israeli citizens were killed or wounded by fedayeen".

The Palestine Liberation Organization was founded in 1964. At its first convention in Cairo, hundreds of Palestinians met to, "call for the right of self-determination and the upholding of the rights of the Palestinian nation." To achieve these goals, a Palestinian army of liberation was thought to be essential; thus, the Palestinian Liberation Army (PLA) was established with the support of the Arab states. Fatah, a Palestinian group founded in the late 1950s to organize the armed resistance against Israel, and headed by Yasser Arafat, soon rose to prominence within the PLO. The PLO charter called for, "an end to the State of Israel, a return of Palestinians to their homeland, and the establishment of a single democratic state throughout Palestine."

Six-Day War and aftermath

Due to Israel's defeat of Arab armies in the Six-Day War, the Palestinian leadership came to the conclusion that the Arab world was unable to challenge Israel militarily in open warfare. Simultaneously, the Palestinians drew lessons from movements and uprisings in Latin America, North Africa and Southeast Asia which led them to move away from guerilla warfare in rural areas towards terrorist attacks in urban environments with an international reach. This led to a series of aircraft hijackings, bombings and kidnappings which culminated in the killings of Israeli athletes during the 1972 Munich Olympic Games. The military superiority of Israel led Palestinian fighters to employ guerrilla tactics from bases in Jordan and Lebanon.

In the wake of the Six-Day War, confrontations between Palestinian guerrillas in Jordan and government forces became a major problem within the kingdom. By early 1970, at least seven Palestinian guerrilla organizations were active in Jordan, one of the most important being the Popular Front for the Liberation of Palestine (PFLP) led by George Habash. Based in the Jordanian refugee camps, the fedayeen developed a virtual state within a state, receiving funds and arms from both the Arab states and Eastern Europe and openly flouting the law of the country. The guerrillas initially focused on attacking Israel, but by late 1968, the main fedayeen activities in Jordan appeared to shift to attempts to overthrow the Jordanian monarchy.

Black September

Various clashes between the fedayeen and the army occurred between the years 1968–1970. The situation climaxed in September 1970, when several attempts to assassinate king Hussein failed. On September 7, 1970, in the series of Dawson's Field hijackings, three planes were hijacked by PFLP: a SwissAir and a TWA that were landed in Azraq area and a Pan Am that was landed in Cairo. Then on September 9, a BOAC flight from Bahrain was also hijacked to Zarqa. The PFLP announced that the hijackings were intended "to pay special attention to the Palestinian problem". After all hostages were removed, the planes were dramatically blown up in front of TV cameras.

A bitterly fought 10-day civil war known as Black September ensued, drawing involvement by Syria and Iraq, and sparking troop movements by Israel and the United States Navy. The number of people killed on all sides were estimated as high as 3,500, other sources claiming it to be as high as 20,000.

Battles between Palestinian guerrilla forces and the Jordanian army continued during the closing months of 1970 and the first six months of 1971. In November 1971, members of the Palestinian Black September group, who took their name from the civil war, assassinated Jordanian Prime Minister Wasfi al-Tal in Cairo. In December the group made an unsuccessful attempt to assassinate the Jordanian ambassador in Britain.

Relocation to Lebanon and Lebanese Civil War
In the aftermath of Black September in Jordan, many Palestinians arrived in Lebanon, among them Yasser Arafat and the Palestinian Liberation Organization (PLO). In the early 1970s their presence exacerbated an already tense situation in Lebanon, and in 1975 the Lebanese Civil War broke out. Beginning with street fighting in Beirut between Christian Phalangists and Palestinian militiamen, the war quickly deteriorated into a conflict between two loosely defined factions: the side wishing to preserve the status quo, consisting primarily of Maronite militias, and the side seeking change, which included a variety of militias from leftist organizations and guerrillas from rejectionist Palestinian (nonmainstream PLO) organizations. The Lebanese civil war lasted until 1990 and resulted in an estimated 130,000 to 250,000 civilian fatalities and one million wounded.

After Black September, the PLO and its offshoots waged an international campaign against Israelis. Notable events were the Munich Olympics massacre (1972), the hijacking of several civilian airliners (some were thwarted, see for example: Entebbe Operation), the Savoy Hotel attack, the Zion Square explosive refrigerator and the Coastal Road massacre. During the 1970s and the early 1980s, Israel suffered attacks from PLO bases in Lebanon, such as the Avivim school bus massacre in 1970, the Maalot massacre in 1974 (where Palestinian militants massacred 21 school children) and the Nahariya attack led by Samir Kuntar in 1979, as well as a terrorist bombing by Ziad Abu Ein that killed two Israeli 16-year-olds and left 36 other youths wounded during the Lag BaOmer celebration in Tiberias. Following the 1982 Israeli invasion of Lebanon, called "Operation Peace for Galilee" by the IDF, and the exile of the PLO to Tunis, Israel had a relatively quiet decade.

International terrorism and internal struggles in 1980s

Mass internal executions of members of the Abu Nidal Organization and their families were conducted by Abu Nidal and his key associates in 1987–1988. The number of executed is estimated at 600 people, mostly Palestinians, done in several separate locations in Syria, Lebanon and Libya.

First Intifada (1987–1993)

The First Intifada was characterized more by grassroots and non-violent political actions from among the population in the Israeli occupied Palestinian territories. A total of 160 Israelis and 2,162 Palestinians were killed, including 1,000 Palestinians killed by other Palestinians under the accusation of being collaborators. The Intifada lasted five years and ended with the signing of the Oslo Accords. The strategy of non-violence, though widespread among Palestinians, was not always adhered to, and there were youth who threw molotov cocktails and stones, with such violence generally directed against Israeli soldiers and settlers.

There were two attacks that represented new developments in terms of political violence inside Israel in this period. The first Palestinian suicide attack took place on July 6, 1989, when a member of the Palestinian Islamic Jihad boarded the Tel Aviv Jerusalem bus 405. He walked up to the driver and pulled the wheel to the right, driving the vehicle into a ravine, killing 16 people. The end of the intifada also saw the first use of suicide bombing as a tactic by Palestinian militants. On April 16, 1993, Hamas carried out the Mehola Junction bombing, in which operative Saher Tamam al-Nabulsi detonated his explosives-laden car between two buses. One person, a Palestinian, other than the attacker was killed, and 21 were wounded.

Oslo Accords to Camp David Summit (1993–2000)

The years between the intifadas were marked by intense diplomatic activity between Israel and Palestinians as well as the creation of the Palestinian National Authority. In this period, suicide bombings of Israeli buses and crowded spaces as a regular tactic, particularly by Hamas and Islamic Jihad.  Attacks during this period include the Beit Lid massacre, a double-suicide bombing at a crowded junction that killed 21 people and the Dizengoff Center massacre, a suicide bombing outside a Tel Aviv shopping mall that killed 13 people.

Second Intifada (2000–2005)

According to B'Tselem, as of July 10, 2005, over 400 members of the Israeli Security forces, and 821 Israeli civilians have been killed by Palestinians since the signing of the Oslo Accords in 1993, 553 of whom were killed within the 1949 Armistice lines, mainly by suicide bombings. Targets of attacks included buses, Israeli checkpoint, restaurants, discothèques, shopping malls, a university, and civilian homes.

In October 2000 a Palestinian mob lynched two non-combatant Israel Defense Forces reservists, Vadim Nurzhitz (sometimes spelled as Norzhich) and Yossi Avrahami (or Yosef Avrahami), who had accidentally entered the Palestinian Authority-controlled city of Ramallah in the West Bank. The brutality of the event, captured in a photo of a Palestinian rioter proudly waving his blood-stained hands to the crowd below, sparked international outrage and further intensified the ongoing conflict between Israeli and Palestinian forces.

Suicide bombings and attacks on civilians 
A spate of suicide bombings and attacks, aimed mostly at civilians (such as the Dolphinarium discotheque suicide bombing), was launched against Israel and elicited a military response. A suicide bombing dubbed the Passover Massacre (30 Israeli civilians were killed at Park hotel, Netanya) climaxed a bloody month of March 2002, in which more than 130 Israelis, mostly civilians, were killed in attacks. Israel launched Operation Defensive Shield. The operation led to the apprehension of many members of militant groups, as well as their weaponry and equipment. 497 Palestinians and 30 Israelis were killed during Operation Defensive Shield.

In 2004, 31 people were killed and 159 others were wounded in a simultaneous attack against multiple tourist destinations in Egypt. Of the dead, 15 were Egyptians, 12 were from Israel, two from Italy, one from Russia, and one was an Israeli-American. According to the Egyptian government, the bombers were Palestinians led by Iyad Saleh, who had tried to enter Israel to carry out attacks there but were unsuccessful.

2005–present

In the mid-2000s Hamas started putting greater emphasis on its political characteristics and strengthened its popularity amongst Palestinians. In 2006 Palestinian legislative elections Hamas won a majority in the Palestinian Legislative Council, prompting the United States and many European countries to cut off all funds to Hamas and the Palestinian Authority, insisting that Hamas must recognize Israel, renounce violence and accept previous peace pacts.

After the Israel's unilateral disengagement plan in 2005 and the 2006 Palestinian legislative elections Hamas took control over all the Gaza Strip in June 2007 in a bloody coup. Palestinian militant groups in the Gaza strip increased the firing of Qassam rockets, mortars and Grad missiles on southern Israel. Attacks continued outside the Gaza strip perimeter, including the attack that resulted in the Israeli soldier Gilad Shalit being captured and held in the Gaza Strip for over five years.

Hamas has made use of guerrilla tactics in the Gaza Strip and to a lesser degree the West Bank. Hamas has adapted these techniques over the years since its inception. According to a 2006 report by rival Fatah party, Hamas had smuggled "between several hundred and 1,300 tons" of advanced rockets, along with other weaponry, into Gaza. Some Israelis and some Gazans both noted similarities in Hamas's military buildup to that of Hezbollah in the 2006 Israel-Hezbollah war.

Hamas has used IEDs and anti-tank rockets against the IDF in Gaza. The latter include standard RPG-7 warheads and home-made rockets such as the Al-Bana, Al-Batar and Al-Yasin. The IDF has a difficult, if not impossible time trying to find hidden weapons caches in Palestinian areas – this is due to the high local support base Hamas enjoys.

During the Gaza War (2008–09), Palestinian militant groups fired rockets aimed at civilian targets which struck the cities of Ashdod, Beersheba and Gedera.  The military wing of Hamas said that after a week from the start, it had managed to fire 302 rockets, at an average of 44 rockets daily. 102 rockets and 35 mortars were fired by Fatah at Israel. Over 750 rockets and mortars were fired from Gaza into Israel during the conflict wounded 182 civilians, killing 3 people, and causing minor suffering to another 584 people suffering from shock and anxiety. Several rockets landed in schools and one fell close to a kindergarten, all located in residential areas.  The UN fact finding mission stated that this constituted a deliberate attack against the civilian population and was unjustifiable in international law.

In 2012, terror attacks against Israelis in the West Bank increased compared to 2011. The number of terror attacks in the West Bank increased from 320 in 2011 to 578 in 2012. The attacks mainly involved rock throwing, Molotov cocktails, firearms and explosives.

In 2013, Hamas stated that the "kidnapping of IDF soldiers is at the heart of Palestinian culture."

Involvement of governments

The Palestinian Authority TV has been accused of glorifying terror. In 2011, Israeli PM Benyamin Netanyahu stated that the incitement promulgated by the Palestinian Authority was destroying Israel's confidence, and he condemned what he regarded as the glorification of the murderers of the Fogel family in Itamar on PA television. The perpetrator of the murders had been described as a "hero" and a "legend" by members of his family, during a weekly program.

Isi Leibler wrote in the Jerusalem Post that Mahmoud Abbas and his chief negotiator Saeb Erekat deny Israel's right to exist and promote vicious hatred against Jews, in statements made in Arabic.  He claimed that the state-controlled Palestinian media praised the murders committed by Palestinians. Abbas al-Sayed who perpetrated the Passover suicide attack at the Park Hotel in Netanya which killed 30 civilians was described by Abbas as a "hero" and "symbol of the Palestinian Authority."

Following the Itamar massacre and a bombing in Jerusalem, 27 US senators sent a letter requesting the US Secretary of State to identify the administration's steps to end Palestinian incitement to violence against Jews and Israel that they said was occurring within the "Palestinian media, mosques and schools, and even by individuals or institutions affiliated with the Palestinian Authority."

The United Nations body UNESCO stopped funding a children's magazine sponsored by the Palestinian Authority that commended Hitler's killing of Jews. It deplored this publication as contrary to its principles of building tolerance and respect for human rights and human dignity.

Palestinian Media Watch reported that the Palestinian Authority spent more than $5 million a month paying salaries to Palestinians and Israeli Arabs imprisoned in Israel for terror crimes. They also stated that groups in a summer camp for children sponsored by PA Prime Minister Salam Fayyad were named after militants: Dalal Mughrabi, who led the Coastal Road Massacre; Salah Khalaf, head of Black September that carried out the Munich massacre; and Abu Ali Mustafa, the general secretary of the Popular Front for the Liberation of Palestine who perpetrated many attacks. Saddam Hussein, the leader of Iraq, donated $25,000 to the families of suicide bombers, and $10,000 to the families of Palestinian civilians killed by the Israeli military.

After Israel agreed to hand over the bodies of dead Palestinian suicide bombers and other militants as part of what the Israeli Government described as 'a humanitarian gesture' to PA chairman Mahmoud Abbas to help the peace process, the Palestinian Authority planned a national rally to honour them and to provide full military funerals. The bodies included the suicide bombers that perpetrated the bus bombing in Jerusalem's Shmuel Hanavi neighborhood which killed twenty-three people, many of them children, and the attacker in the Cafe Hillel bombing. Israel will also return the remains of the bombers that committed the bombings on two buses in Beersheba in 2004 killing 16 people, the Stage night club bombing, the attack on the open-air Hadera market as well as the attackers of the Savoy Hotel in Tel Aviv who killed eight hostages. The Palestinian Authority and Hamas both planned official ceremonies and PA president Abbas attended a ceremony at his Muqataa compound. Prisoners Affairs Minister Qaraqi called on Palestinians for a day of celebration. The rally in honor of the dead will be attended by PA President Mahmoud Abbas, PLO leaders, and families of the dead militants. The dead are considered martyrs by Palestinians, but viewed as terrorists by Israelis.

Palestinian President Mahmoud Abbas has been accused of incitement to violence, on the basis of a statement he made concerning youths injured in defending the Haram al Sharif/Temple Mount from what Palestinians have seen as attempts to alter the status quo. he declared in September 2015: "“Every drop of blood spilled in Jerusalem is pure, every shahid [martyr] will reach paradise, and every injured person will be rewarded by God."."

Use of women and children by terrorist groups

In the 1930s, the emergence of organized youth cadres was rooted in the desire to form a youth paramilitary. It was believed that armed youth might bring an end to British hegemony in the Middle East. Youth were cajoled into violence by Palestinian political figures and newspapers that glorified violence and death. The Palestinian Arab Party sponsored the development of storm troops consisting solely of children and youth. A British report from the period stated that "the growing youth and scout movements must be regarded as the most probable factors for the disturbance of the peace".

As a youngster, Yasir Arafat led neighborhood children in marching and drills, beating those who did not obey. In the 1940s, Arafat's father organized a group of militants in Gaza which included Yasir Arafat and his brothers. The leader, Abu Khalid, a mathematics teacher in Gaza, gave Arafat the name Yasir in honor of the militant Yasir al-Bireh.

Modern

Child suicide bombers

As part of the Arab–Israeli conflict, especially during the Second Intifada from 2000 to 2005, Palestinian militant groups used children for suicide bombings. Minors were recruited to attack Israeli targets, both military and civilian. This deliberate involvement of children in armed conflict was condemned by international human rights organizations.

According to Amnesty International, "Palestinian armed groups have repeatedly shown total disregard for the most fundamental human rights, notably the right to life, by deliberately targeting Israeli civilians and by using Palestinian children in armed attacks. Children are susceptible to recruitment by manipulation or may be driven to join armed groups for a variety of reasons, including a desire to avenge relatives or friends killed by the Israeli army."

Human shields

According to the United Nations Secretary General Ban Ki-Moon, Hamas is launching rockets inside schools to use the death toll as a media stunt and deter Israel from attacking Gaza. This tactics is usually referred to as the Human Shield.

Involvement of women
Women in particular have increasingly associated political violence with expanded citizenship rights due to the perceived failure of nonmilitaristic tactics to achieve political goals, primary amongst these, the achievement of Palestinian autonomy.

The profile of the female Palestinian suicide bombers has been the subject of study by Katherine VanderKaay, who presented her profiling of the subjects at the American Psychological Association's annual meeting. While the first suicide bombing undertaken by a Palestinian took place in 1994, the first female suicide bomber from among Palestinian society did not emerge until January 2002. The bomber was Wafa Idris, a 28-year-old paramedic and a supporter of secularist parties.

Violence against civilians

According to B'Tselem, the Israeli Information Center for Human Rights in the Occupied Territories, 500 Israeli civilians were killed by Palestinians from September 29, 2000, to March 31, 2012, in Israel, and another 254 Israeli civilians were killed in the Gaza Strip and the West Bank.
B'tselem reported that the main argument used to justify violence against civilians is that "all means are legitimate in fighting for independence against a foreign occupation". B'Tselem criticized this argument, saying it is completely baseless, and contradicts the fundamental principle of international humanitarian law. "According to this principle, civilians are to be protected from the consequences of warfare, and any attack must discriminate between civilians and military targets. This principle is part of international customary law; as such, it applies to every state, organization, and person, even those who are not party to any relevant convention."

B'Tselem further noted that Palestinian spokespersons distinguish between attacks inside Israel proper and attacks directed at settlers in the Occupied Territories, stating that since the settlements are illegal and many settlers belong to Israel's security forces, settlers are not entitled to the international law protections granted to civilians. Human rights group B'tselem rejected this argument, and stated: "The illegality of the settlements has no effect at all on the status of their civilian residents. The settlers constitute a distinctly civilian population, which is entitled to all the protections granted civilians by international law. The Israeli security forces' use of land in the settlements or the membership of some settlers in the Israeli security forces does not affect the status of the other residents living among them, and certainly does not make them proper targets of attack. B'Tselem strongly opposes the attempts to justify attacks against Israeli civilians by using distorted interpretations of international law. Furthermore, B'Tselem demands that the Palestinian Authority do everything within its power to prevent future attacks and to prosecute the individuals involved in past attacks."

Rocket attacks within the green line

Palestinian rocket and mortar attacks on Israel from the Gaza Strip have occurred since 2001. Between 2001 and January 2009, over 8,600 rockets had been launched, leading to 28 deaths and several hundred injuries, as well as widespread psychological trauma and disruption of daily life.

The weapons, often generically referred to as Qassams, were initially crude and short-range, mainly affecting the Israeli city of Sderot and other communities bordering the Gaza Strip. However, in 2006 more sophisticated rockets began to be deployed, reaching the larger coastal city of Ashkelon, and by early 2009 major cities Ashdod and Beersheba had been hit by Katyusha and Grad rockets.

Attacks have been carried out by all Palestinian armed groups, and, prior to the 2008–2009 Gaza War, were consistently supported by most Palestinians, although the stated goals have been mixed. The attacks, widely condemned for targeting civilians, have been described as terrorism by United Nations, European Union and Israeli officials, and are defined as war crimes by human rights groups Amnesty International and Human Rights Watch.

Defenses constructed specifically to deal with the weapons include fortifications for schools and bus stops as well as an alarm system named Red Color. Iron Dome, a system to intercept short-range rockets, was developed by Israel and first deployed in the spring of 2011 to protect Beersheba and Ashkelon, but officials and experts warned that it would not be completely effective. Shortly thereafter, it intercepted a Palestinian Grad rocket for the first time.

The attacks were a stated cause of the Gaza blockade, the Gaza War (December 27, 2008 – January 21, 2009) and other Israeli military operations in the Gaza Strip, including Operation Rainbow (May 2004), Operation Days of Penitence (2004), the 2006 Israel-Gaza conflict, Operation Autumn Clouds (2006), and Operation Hot Winter (2008).

Attacks began in 2001. Since then, nearly 4,800 rockets have hit southern Israel, just over 4,000 of them since Israel withdrew from the Gaza Strip in August 2005. The range of the rockets has increased over time. The original Qassam rocket has a range of about  but more advanced rockets, including versions of the old Soviet Grad or Katyusha have hit Israeli targets  from Gaza.

Some analysts see the attacks as a shift away from reliance on suicide bombing, which was previously Hamas's main method of attacking Israel, and an adoption of the rocket tactics used by Lebanese militant group Hezbollah.

Denial of service attacks on the emergency services
There have been a number of reports in the Israeli press about denial of service attacks by Palestinians on the Magen David Adom and other emergency call lines. A spokesman said that they had received up to 2400 harassing calls per day to the Beersheba MDA office deputy Mayor of Sderot said that after investigation that Palestinians were blocking the ability of citizens to seek for help after mortar and missile attacks. According to the MDA director in the Negev some callers identified themselves as Palestinians and said that they had been paid to make the calls. The director said the calls were intended to block the MDA's ability to provide emergency services particularly during major events such as mortar attacks. As of 2006 filtering systems had been developed and deployed to handle with this type of calls, according to MDA 2008 report one filtering system recognized more than 129,000 phone calls as abusive calls.

Threats of using Chemical and Biological weapons

In a testimony given to the congress, it had been reported that Hamas was seeking to acquire chemical and biological weapons during 1990–1993.

In a statement by Director of Central Intelligence George J. Tenet before the Senate Select Committee on Intelligence on The Worldwide Threat in 2000: 
Global Realities of Our National Security, it was stated that Hamas was pursuing a capability to conduct attacks with toxic chemicals.

The plot for Passover massacre included the use of Cyanide. 4 kilos of Cyanide had been bought and prepared for a chemical attack.

In 2003, one report by the CSIS stated The Palestinian terrorist group that allegedly recruited a Canadian to carry out attacks in North America may be developing chemical weapons.

On June 26, 2006, Yedioth Ahronot published a report stating that Fatah's armed wing said it had developed biological, chemical weapons, which would be used if Israel invaded Gaza. ‘We say to Olmert, Peretz: Your threats of invasion do not frighten us. We will surprise you with new weapons you have not faced until now,’ Al-Aqsa Brigades says.

On June 29, 2006, the al-Aqsa Martyrs Brigades, claimed to have launched a single rocket with a chemical warhead against the southern part of Israel. An Israeli military spokeswoman said the army had not detected that any such rocket was fired, nor was there any report of such a weapon hitting Israel.

Israeli news reports have stated that chemical weapons, and missiles with chemical warheads from Libya have been transferred to Palestinians in Gaza,    with some allegedly transferred via Sudan, although Sudanese officials have denied the accusations.

Palestinian stone-throwing

Palestinian stone-throwing is a violent political statement celebrated in the literature of the Palestinian national liberation movement.  Stone throwing was the primary tactic of the First Intifada (1997 – 1993.) It encompasses the practice of throwing stones by hand and using powerful slings variously aimed at Israel security personnel, Israeli civilians, and at both civilian and military vehicles.  It has resulted in the death of both Israelis and Arabs unknowingly targeted by stone-throwers.

Internal violence

B'Tselem reports that from September 29, 2000, to March 31, 2012, there were 669 Palestinians killed by Palestinians. Of those, 134 were killed for suspected collaboration with Israel.

Concerning the killing of Palestinians by other Palestinians, a January 2003 Humanist magazine article reports:
For over a decade the PA has violated Palestinian human rights and civil liberties by routinely killing civilians—including collaborators, demonstrators, journalists, and others—without charge or fair trial. Of the total number of Palestinian civilians killed during this period by both Israeli and Palestinian security forces, 16 percent were the victims of Palestinian security forces.

... According to Freedom House's annual survey of political rights and civil liberties, Freedom in the World 2001–2002, the chaotic nature of the Intifada along with strong Israeli reprisals has resulted in a deterioration of living conditions for Palestinians in Israeli-administered areas. The survey states:

"Civil liberties declined due to: shooting deaths of Palestinian civilians by Palestinian security personnel; the summary trial and executions of alleged collaborators by the Palestinian Authority (PA); extrajudicial killings of suspected collaborators by militias; and the apparent official encouragement of Palestinian youth to confront Israeli soldiers, thus placing them directly in harm's way."

Internal Palestinian violence has been called an Intrafada.

Palestinian attitudes towards political violence

1995–2000
A study conducted by Mkhaimer Abusada of Al-Azhar University explored attitudes towards the use of political violence. Four questions were posed on the subject of political violence to over a thousand respondents randomly selected from localities in the West Bank and Gaza Strip. The first question was: "Do you support the continuing resort of some Palestinian factions to armed operations against Israeli targets in Gaza and Jericho?" Overall, 56% of respondents responded negatively. Those affiliated with leftist groups showed the highest levels of support for armed attacks against Israelis (74%), while those affiliated with parties supporting the peace process showed the lowest levels (24%). The Islamic opposition was split, with slightly over half in favor, and slightly less than half opposed.

In September 1995, survey participants were asked whether they supported, opposed or had no opinion with regard to "armed attacks against Israeli army targets," "armed attacks against Israeli settlers," and "armed attacks against Israeli civilian targets." The majority supported the use of armed attacks against Israeli military targets and settlers in the West Bank and Gaza Strip. Support crossed all party lines and groups, and was highest among the Islamic opposition (91% and 84%) and the leftists (90% and 89%), though a significant majority of those who supported the peace process also supported armed attacks on military targets and settlers (69% and 73%). To explain the apparent paradox in the latter position, Abusada quotes Shikaki (1996) who, "contends that Palestinian support for the use of armed attacks against Israeli military targets and settlers does not indicate 'opposition to the peace process but Palestinian insistence that the process entails an end to occupation and settlements.'" Palestinian support for armed attacks against Israeli civilian targets in Israel was 20% overall, with support being highest among those affiliated with the Islamic opposition (42%) and the leftists (32%), and lowest among supporters of the peace process (12%) and the National Independents (10%).

2000–04
A July 2001 poll conducted by the Palestinian Center for Policy & Survey Research (PSR) found that 58 percent of Palestinians supported armed attacks against Israeli civilians inside Israel and 92 percent supported armed confrontations against the Israeli army in the West Bank and the Gaza Strip. A May 2002 poll by the center found that support for bombings of civilians inside Israel dropped to 52%, but support for armed attacks against Israeli settlers remained "very high" at 89 percent. Support for armed attacks against soldiers stood at 92 percent. A poll after the 2003 Maxim restaurant suicide bombing, in which 20 Israelis were killed, found that 75 percent of Palestinians supported the attack, with support higher, "in the Gaza Strip (82%) compared to the West Bank (70%), in refugee camps (84%) compared to towns and villages (69%), among women (79%) compared to men (71%), among the young (78%) compared to the old (66%), among students (81%) compared to professionals (33%), and among supporters of Hamas (92%) compared to supporters of Fateh (69%)."

The firing of rockets from Beit Hanoun into Israel was acceptable to about three-quarters of the Palestinian public in the occupied territories, and was higher in the West Bank (78%) compared to the Gaza Strip (71%), among students (83%) compared to merchants (63%), and among supporters of Hamas (86%) compared to supporters of Fatah (73%). While firing rockets from Beit Hanoun was supported by a majority of Palestinians (75%), 59% of the residents of Beit Hanoun rejected this practice. 83% of Palestinians favored a mutual cessation of violence.

A report by the Jerusalem Media and Communication Center, a Palestinian organization, showing trends based on polls conducted since 1997, indicated that Palestinian support for military operations against Israeli targets stood at 34–40 percent in 1997–1999, climbed to 65–85 percent in 2000–2004, and dropped back to 41 percent at the end of 2004. "Military operations" were defined as including shootings, car bombs and mortar rocket attacks, but not suicide bombings. A 2005 poll by the center indicated that 53 percent of Palestinians supported "the continuation of [the] Al-Aqsa Intifada, 50 percent supported "suicide bombings against Israeli civilians", and 36 percent supported "the resumption of military operations against Israeli targets".

A 2004 study by Victoroff et al. was conducted on a group of 52 boys, all 14 years old, from the al-Shati camp in Gaza. Forty-three percent of the boys reported that a family member had been wounded or killed by the IDF, and half lived in households where the father's employment was lost following the outbreak of the Second Intifada. "Sympathy for terrorism" was found to be correlated with depression and anxiety scores, as well as with the level of "perceived oppression," and "emotional distress". Of those who felt subject to unjust treatment, 77 percent expressed sympathy for terrorism.

2005–present

A March 2008 report by Palestinian Center for Policy & Survey Research (PSR) noted that the level of support for armed attack against Israeli civilians inside Israel increased significantly with 67% supporting and 31% opposed, compared to support by 40% in 2005 and 55% in 2006. A February 2008 suicide bombing that killed one Israeli woman in Dimona was supported by 77% and opposed by 19%. An overwhelming majority of 84 percent supported the March 2008 Mercaz HaRav massacre, in which a Palestinian gunman killed eight students and wounded eleven in a Jerusalem school. Support for the attack was 91 percent in the Gaza Strip compared to 79 percent in the West Bank. Similar suicide attacks in 2005 had been less widely supported, with 29% support for a suicide attack that took place in Tel Aviv, and 37% support for another one in Beersheba.

The 2009 Hamas political violence took place in the Gaza Strip during and after the 2009 Gaza War. A series of violent acts, ranging from physical assaults, torture, and executions of Palestinians suspected of collaboration with the Israel Defense Forces, as well as members of the Fatah political party, occurred. According to Human Rights Watch, at least 32 people were killed by these attacks: 18 during the conflict and 14 afterward, and several dozen more were maimed, many by shots to the legs.

In 2012, the number of militant attacks in the West Bank rose from 320 in 2011 to 578 in 2012. During that same year, 282 attacks were carried out in Jerusalem, compared to 191 in 2011. According to an annual Shin Bet report, the increase is due in part to a 68% rise of attacks using molotov cocktails. However, the number of attacks involving firearms and explosives also grew by 42%—37 compared to 26 in 2011.

Casualties
Palestinian deaths by other Palestinians since 1982.

Palestinian groups involved in political violence
Hamas
 Founded in 1987 by Ahmed Yassin and Mohammad Taha as an outgrowth of the Muslim Brotherhood, Hamas' goal is the establishment of a Palestinian state.
 Armed wing is the Izz ad-Din al-Qassam Brigades; the sole target of its suicide bombings and missile attacks is Israel.
 Took part in 2006 elections and won. After the 2007 Battle of Gaza the Hamas government was disbanded by Mahmoud Abbas but remained de facto rulers of the Gaza Strip.
 Currently led by Khaled Mashaal and Ismail Haniyeh
Palestinian Islamic Jihad (PIJ) (founded 1970s)
 Formed by Fathi Shaqaqi as a branch of Egyptian Islamic Jihad
 Goal is the destruction of the state of Israel and replacement with an Islamist state
 Armed wing is the Al-Quds Brigades (Jerusalem brigades)
 Currently led by Ramadan Shallah, the Secretary General and Abd Al Aziz Awda
 The Popular Resistance Committees
 Islamist
 Founded in 2000 by Jamal Abu Samhadana who led the group until he was killed in 2006.
 Hamas linked group, based in the Gaza Strip
Palestine Liberation Organization (PLO) (founded June 1964)
 Formed as the political representation of the Palestinian people
 Currently led by Mahmoud Abbas

Sub-groups of the PLO
 Popular Front for the Liberation of Palestine (PFLP) (founded 1967)
 Left-wing
 Joined the PLO in 1968 and became the second-largest PLO faction, after Arafat's al-Fatah, but withdrew in 1974, accusing the group of moving away from the goal of abolishing the State of Israel. It was led by Abu Ali Mustapha until his assassination in 2001.
 Armed wing is the Abu Ali Mustapha Brigades and Jihad Jibril Brigades
 Currently led by Ahmad Sa'adat
 Democratic Front for the Liberation of Palestine (DFLP) (founded 1969)
 Marxist-Leninist group that believes Palestinian national goals can be achieved only through revolution of the masses. Split into two factions in 1991; Nayif Hawatmah leads the majority and more hard-line faction, which continue to dominate the group. Joined with other rejectionist groups to form the Alliance of Palestinian Forces (APF) to oppose the Declaration of Principles signed in 1993. Broke from the APF – along with the PFLP – over ideological differences. Has made limited moves towards merging with the PFLP since the mid-1990s.
 Abu Nidal organization (ANO), also known as Fatah - the Revolutionary Council (FRC), (founded 1974)
 Split from PLO; part of the so-called rejectionist front, the ANO is a secular, nationalist group. Was led by Abu Nidal, widely regarded as the most ruthless of the Palestinian leaders, until his death in August 2002. According to Kameel Nasr, Arab and Israeli Terrorism, The group was infiltrated and influenced by Israeli security.
 Palestine Liberation Front (PLF)
 Minor Left wing faction
 Founded in 196 by Ahmed Jibril and Shafiq al-Hout, re established in 1977 by Abu Abbas
Arab Liberation Front (ALF)
 Minor faction tied to the Iraqi Ba'ath Party
 Founded in 1969, first leader was Zeid Heidar
 Currently led by Rakad Salem
As-Sa'iqa (VPLW)
 Palestinian branch of the Syrian Ba'ath Party
 Founded in 1966 as alternative to Fatah, organisation boycotts Palestinian National Authority and is opposed to Oslo Accords
 Organisation was not active during the Second Intifada
 Currently led by Farhan Abu Al-Hayja.
Palestinian Popular Struggle Front (PPSF)
 Minor Socialist faction formerly led by Samir Ghawshah
Palestinian Arab Front (PAF)
 Minor Arab Nationalist faction
 Originally part of the ALF, split from the ALF in 1993
 Supports the Palestinian right of return and creation of Palestinian state within 1967 borders
 Currently led by Jameel Shihadeh.
 Fatah (founded early 1960s)
 Palestinian nationalist political party
 Reverse acronym for "Harekat at-Tahrir al-Wataniyyeh al-Falastiniyyeh" ("Palestinian National Liberation Movement" in Arabic)
 Also known as the Movement for the National Liberation of Palestine
 Founded by Yasser Arafat in 1959. Took control of the PLO in 1968, with Arafat as chairman.
 Currently led by Mahmoud Abbas

Groups associated with Fatah
 Tanzim (founded 1995)
 Means "organization" in Arabic
 Loosely organized Fatah militia
 Led by Marwan Barghouti until his arrest in 2002.
 Force 17 (early 1970s–2007)
 Elite unit of the PLO once under Yasser Arafat's direct guidance.
 Acts as a versatile unit for combat and intelligence-gathering.
 Dismantled in 2007 and incorporated into the Palestinian Presidential Guard.
 Fatah Special Operations Group (Fatah-SOG)
 Founded in the early 1970s by Col. Abdullah Abd al-Hamid Labib
 Also known as the Martyrs of Tel Al Za'atar, Hawari, and Amn Araissi.
 Recently inactive (as of 2004)
 Ahmed Abu Reish Brigade
 Extremist offshoot of Fatah.
 Was involved in the July 17, 2004, kidnappings in the Gaza Strip.
 Possibly linked to the Popular Resistance Committees
 Led by Ahmed Abu Reish
 Al Aqsa Martyrs Brigade
 Responsible for many suicide bombings and shootings of Israeli civilians
 Responsible for executing suspected conspirators and leaders of opposition against Arafat
 Funded by Fatah and the Palestinian Authority
 Offshoot of this group, Fatah Hawks, has carried out guerrilla attacks against Israeli military personnel in the Gaza Strip.
 Black September Organization (1970–1973)
 Began as a small cell of Fatah men determined to take revenge upon King Hussein and the Jordanian army for Black September in Jordan. Recruits from the PFLP, as-Sa'iqa, and other groups also joined.
 Carried out Munich massacre.
 Carried out Attack on the Saudi embassy in Khartoum
In 1973 two members of the Black September attacked, with sub-machine guns and grenades, at the passenger lounge at Ellinikon International Airport in Athens, Greece. Three civilians have been killed and 55 have been wounded. After the attack the gunmen took hostages, for more than two hours, before surrendering to the Greek police. Most of the casualties and injured were Greeks and Americans.

Splinter groups of the PLO
 Popular Front for the Liberation of Palestine - General Command (PFLP-GC) (founded 1968)
 Splinter group from the PFLP, founded by Ahmed Jibril. Declared its focus would be military, not political. Was a member of the PLO, but left in 1974 for the same reasons as PFLP.

al-Qaeda linked groups
Army of Islam (Jaysh al-Islam)
 Also known as the Tawhid and Jihad Brigades and al-Qaeda in Palestine
 The group are an armed Gaza clan named Doghmush who are affiliated with al-Qaeda and Abu Qatada
Abdullah Azzam Brigades
Jund Ansar Allah (2008–)
al-Qaeda-affiliated group in the Gaza Strip, founded in November 2008 by Abdel Latif Moussa
In August 2009, the group proclaimed the creation of an Islamic emirate in Gaza and led an armed rebellion against Hamas.
The group's leader Abdel Latif Moussa was killed during that rebellion.
Fatah al-Islam (2006–)
al-Qaeda-affiliated group involved in a conflict with the Lebanese army in 2007 over control of Palestinian refugee camps, which caused the death of nearly 500 people.
The group was established in 2006 by Shaker al-Abssi who led the group until killed by Lebanese forces in 2007.
Abu Mohamad Awad succeeded al-Abbsi as the group's leader.
Jund al-Sham (1999–2008)
Radical Islamist group set up by Palestinians and Syrians which operated in different areas of the Middle East.
The group's leader Abu Youssef Sharqieh was captured by Lebanese forces during the 2007 conflict in Palestinian refugee camps.
The group was disbanded in 2008 as its members joined Lebanese al-Qaeda affiliated group Osbat al-Ansar.
Jaljalat (2006–)
 A Hamas-splinter organisation founded in 2006 by Mahmoud Taleb, a former al-Qassam Brigades commander, after he opposed Hamas joining the 2006 elections
 The group is affiliated with both Jund Ansar Allah and al-Qaeda
Jahafil Al-Tawhid Wal-Jihad fi Filastin (2008–)
 al-Qaeda-affiliated group in the Gaza Strip, founded in November 2008 by Abu al-Walid al-Maqdisi

Iran linked groups
Sabireen Movement (2014–)
Leadership converted to Shiism
At odds with both Hamas and Palestinian Islamic Jihad
Openly supports Hezbollah and Iran as well as their intervention on behalf of the Syrian Government

Notable attacks

1974 Japanese Embassy attack in Kuwait
1979 Nahariya attack
1980 Paris synagogue bombing
1981 Antwerp bombing
2000 Ramallah lynching
2004 Sinai bombings
2008 Dimona suicide bombing
2011 Itamar attack
Assassination of Robert F. Kennedy
Attack on the Saudi embassy in Khartoum
Avivim school bus massacre
Beit Lid massacre
Coastal Road massacre
Dizengoff Street bus bombing
Dolphinarium discotheque suicide bombing
1973 Athens Hellinikon International Airport attack
EgyptAir Flight 648
El Al Flight 253 attack
Har Nof synagogue massacre
Hebrew University massacre
Hijacking of Achille Lauro
Jaffa Road bus bombings
Jerusalem bus 19 suicide bombing
Karkur junction suicide bombing
Kiryat Menachem bus bombing
Lod Airport massacre
Ma'ale Akrabim massacre
Ma'alot massacre
Maxim restaurant suicide bombing
Mercaz HaRav massacre
Munich massacre
Night of the Gliders
Pan Am Flight 110 Rome – Italy
Passover massacre
Pi Glilot bombing
Rome and Vienna airport attacks
Sabena Flight 571
Savoy Hotel Attack
Sbarro restaurant suicide bombing
Shawarma restaurant bombing
Swissair Flight 330

See also

 Civilian casualties in the Second Intifada
 Crime in Israel
 Death of Daniel Wultz
 Fatah–Hamas conflict
 Islamic terrorism
 Israeli casualties of war
 Israeli settler violence
 List of killings and massacres in Mandatory Palestine
 List of Palestinian suicide attacks
 Palestinian casualties of war
 Political violence
 Victims of Acts of Terror Memorial
 Violence in the Israeli–Palestinian conflict
 Zionist political violence

References

Bibliography

External links

Israeli–Palestinian conflict
 
 
Terrorism in Israel
Terrorism in Mandatory Palestine